V. Ravichandran may refer to:
 Viswanathan Ravichandran
 Ravichandran (Kannada actor), full name Veeraswamy Ravichandran